Xulhaz Mannan (12 October 1976 – 25 April 2016) was an employee of the United States embassy in Dhaka and the founder of Bangladesh's first and only LGBT-themed magazine, Roopbaan.  He was killed in his apartment along with another LGBT activist Mahbub Rabbi Tonoy in a machete attack by Islamist extremists.

Early life and education
Mannan's mother is a retired education ministry officer, and his father, who died several years ago was actively involved with the Bangladeshi independence movement in 1971.

Mannan was born on 12 October 1976. He completed his SSC and HSC (1993) at Dhaka Residential Model College. He was involved in cultural activities from junior school. He then completed his B.Com at City College, Dhaka.  Later he studied at Dhaka University and finished with honors in International Relations. In 2003 he received a master's degree of Social Sciences in Peace and Conflict Studies.

Career
He started his career in MGH group, and later joined the US embassy, Dhaka, as a protocol officer of the ambassador till 2015 and then switched to US Aid in September 2015. He was involved in many activities outside work. He was a script writer for a NTV production at the very beginning. Photography, travel, hiking, event organizing were some of his hobbies.

Mannan was founder and publisher of Roopbaan, the only magazine for the LGBT community in Bangladesh launched in 2014. He had worked in the human rights sector especially for the LGBT community in Bangladesh. He successfully arranged a "rainbow rally" in Dhaka in April 2014, however the rally was canceled in 2016 on police instruction as Islamic groups threatened to kill anyone taking part.

On 27 April 2016, Bangladeshi prime minister Sheikh Hasina criticized his writings by comparing them with adult content.

Death

He had received death threats after trying to organise a youth LBGT "Rainbow Rally" in early April 2016. Mannan was killed in his apartment along with LGBT activist Mahbub Rabbi Tonoy in a stabbing attack shortly after he had posted pictures of himself on the Internet and openly declaring he was gay. It is believed it was the open declaration of his sexuality which gave the go ahead for the extremist group that killed him.  A witness reported five men leaving the scene chanting "Allahu Akbar" ("Allah is Great"). Ansar al-Islam, an Al-Qaida-linked group claimed responsibility for the murders stating as he had himself confirmed his sexuality he needed to be killed according to shariah law.

In May 2019, eight extremists were charged by Bangladesh police for the murders. Four of the eight are in custody and police are still searching for the others.

In August 2021 the court sentenced six people to death for the murder.

Reactions
 USAID, following Mannan's death published a statement calling him "a dedicated and courageous advocate for human rights".
 The United States Department of State told to Reuters, "We are outraged by the barbaric attack on Mr Xulhaz Mannan, a beloved member of our embassy family and a courageous advocate for LGBTI rights. Human rights, actually".
 US ambassador Marcia Bernicat condemned the killing by saying "We abhor this senseless act of violence".
 US Secretary of State John Kerry phoned prime minister Sheikh Hasina and urged the arrest of Mannan's killers.
On the 5-year anniversary of his death USAID issued a statement remembering Mannan and demanding that his murderers be brought to justice
Also on the 5-year anniversary United States Secretary of State Antony Blinken issued a statement remembering his 9 years at the embassy before joining USAID
In France, various NPOs together award the "Out d'Or" prize to people who have made an outstanding contribution to the visibility of LGBT people. The prize is awarded in seven categories. In the category "foreign press" it is called "Prix Xulhaz Mannan".

Xulhaz Mannan Memorial Award of Diversity
Equal Networks started Xulhaz Mannan Memorial Award of Diversity in honour of Xulhaz Mannan who has died, so that he will be remembered.

See also
 Attacks by Islamic extremists in Bangladesh
 Islam and homosexuality
 Violence against LGBT people

References

1976 births
2016 deaths
Gay journalists
Bangladeshi LGBT rights activists
Bangladeshi LGBT people
Gay writers
Victims of anti-LGBT hate crimes
Terrorist incidents in Bangladesh in 2016
ISIL terrorist incidents in Bangladesh
People murdered in Dhaka
Attacks on secularists in Bangladesh
Assassinated Bangladeshi journalists
Assassinated editors
Violence against gay men
Violence against men in Asia